Nizar Wattad is an American screenwriter, producer and hip-hop artist.

Wattad graduated from the George Washington University in 2002 and worked as a journalist. Wattad began his ongoing collaboration with Hany Abu-Assad, the Oscar-nominated and Golden Globe-winning film director  of Paradise Now.

He was recruited by Walt Disney Pictures to write the screenplay for the company's first Arabic language film, The United, which was released by Touchstone in 2012.

Music
Wattad and his younger brother Bader began freestyle rapping while growing up in Johnson City, Tennessee. They formed The Philistines, and in 2003 released an album, Self Defined, with lyrics reflecting a wide range of contemporary issues, notably the situation of the Palestinians.

Wattad continued to perform alongside his long-time friend and colleague Omar Chakaki (Offendum), with whom he co-produced the NOMADS vs Philistines mixtape in 2006. They have also collaborated with HBO Def Poet Mark Gonzales on the spoken-word performance-lecture Brooklyn Beats to Beirut Streets.

References
 
 Sundance/RAWI Lab Announcement
 Elon University Article
 WireTap
 The Electronic Intifada

External links
 Official website
 
 Institute for Middle East Understanding profile
 Re-Volt Radio Interview
 Brooklyn Beats to Beirut Streets

Living people
American people of Palestinian descent
Year of birth missing (living people)